John William Carroll (15 January 1922 – 17 September 1999) was an Australian rules footballer who played with Collingwood in the Victorian Football League (VFL).

Carroll played two games for Collingwood while serving in the Royal Australian Air Force during World War II.

Notes

External links 

1922 births
1999 deaths
Australian rules footballers from Victoria (Australia)
Collingwood Football Club players